Arjun Panditrao Khotkar (born 1 January 1962)  is a Shiv Sena politician from Jalna district, Marathwada. He was Member of Legislative Assembly from Jalna (Vidhan Sabha constituency), Maharashtra, India as a member of Shiv Sena. He was appointed Maharashtra's minister of state for Textile, Animal Husbandry, Dairy Development, and Fisheries in July, 2016. He has been elected for 4 terms in the Maharashtra Legislative Assembly for 1990, 1995, 2004 & 2014. He was Minister of state in Shiv Sena Government 1999. On 25 November 2017 his 2014 election from Jalna constituency was declared void by Aurangabad Bench of Bombay High Court for filing his nomination papers after deadline has ended.

Positions held
 1990: Elected to Maharashtra Legislative Assembly (1st term)
 1995: Re-Elected to Maharashtra Legislative Assembly (2nd term)
 1999: Minister of State in Maharashtra Government
 2004: Re-Elected to Maharashtra Legislative Assembly (3rd term)
 2014: Re-Elected to Maharashtra Legislative Assembly (4th term)
 2015: Estimate Samiti Pramukh Maharashtra Vidhan Mandal
 2016: Minister of State for Textile, Animal Husbandry, Dairy Development, and Fisheries in Maharashtra State Government
 2017: Appointed as Guardian minister of Nanded District 
 2018: Appointed as Guardian minister of Osmanabad District

See also
 Devendra Fadnavis ministry
 Narayan Rane ministry

References

External links
 Official Website
 Shivsena Home Page
 http://divyamarathi.bhaskar.com/news/MAH-MAR-AUR-jalna-midc-news-5088917-NOR.html
 http://www.business-standard.com/article/politics/land-acquisition-bill-shiv-sena-to-abstain-from-voting-in-rajya-sabha-too-115031100135_1.html
 http://www.loksatta.com/daily/20090601/mtv31.htm
 http://www.loksatta.com/mumbai-news/then-demand-separate-marathwada-shiv-sena-mla-arjun-khotkar-1086005
 http://indianexpress.com/article/india/maharashtra/shiv-sena-bjp-mlas-protest-against-fadnavis-government-over-drought-relief/

1962 births
Living people
People from Jalna district
Maharashtra MLAs 1990–1995
Maharashtra MLAs 1995–1999
Maharashtra MLAs 2004–2009
Maharashtra MLAs 2014–2019
People from Jalna, Maharashtra
Marathi politicians